Gary Frances Reid (born 31 October 1960) is a New Zealand rower.

Reid was born in 1960 in Whakatane, New Zealand. He represented New Zealand at the 1984 Summer Olympics. He is listed as New Zealand Olympian athlete number 491 by the New Zealand Olympic Committee.

References

1960 births
Living people
New Zealand male rowers
Rowers at the 1984 Summer Olympics
Olympic rowers of New Zealand
Sportspeople from Whakatāne